Veliki Vrh pri Šmarju is a settlement northwest of Šmarje–Sap in the Municipality of Grosuplje in central Slovenia. The area is part of the historical region of Lower Carniola. The municipality is now included in the Central Slovenia Statistical Region.

Name
The name of the settlement was changed from Veliki Vrh to Veliki Vrh pri Šmarju in 1955.

References

External links

Veliki Vrh pri Šmarju on Geopedia

Populated places in the Municipality of Grosuplje